Martinus Smit (born 27 February 1956) is a South African cricketer. He played in ten first-class and three List A matches in 2007.

References

External links
 

1956 births
Living people
South African cricketers
Boland cricketers
Eastern Province cricketers
Griqualand West cricketers